William Baseley (by 1521 – 1573/74), of Lambeth and Southwark, Surrey and Garsdon, Wiltshire, was an English politician.

He was a Member (MP) of the Parliament of England for Calne in April 1554 and for Wiltshire in 1555.

References

1570s deaths
English MPs 1554–1555
People from Wiltshire
People from Lambeth
People from Southwark
People from Surrey
Year of birth uncertain